Andrew Mensah Pomeyie (born 11 June 1983) is a striker from Ghana. He was previously a regular for one of Ghana's top teams Great Olympics and has last played for Mahindra United.

Clubs 
 2001-2003 Sekondi Hasaacas
 2004-2005 Great Olympics
 2006-2008 Mahindra United

References 

1983 births
Living people
Ghanaian footballers
Ghanaian expatriate footballers
Sekondi Hasaacas F.C. players
Accra Great Olympics F.C. players
Mahindra United FC players
Association football forwards
Expatriate footballers in India